Maianthemum comaltepecense is a rare perennial, terrestrial herb found as an understory species in moist forests and endemic to southwest Mexico.

Description
Stems are hairless, recurved and flexuous.

Leaves
Plants have 4 or 5 (sometimes 6) leaves that are sessile or short stalked.

Flowering clusters
4 to 12 flowers are set on a compound raceme with 1 or 2 flowers per node. The raceme is 1.5 to 4.5 cm long and flexuous.

Flowers and fruits  
Information on flower size and color not available. Fruits are 3-lobed, 6–9 mm across, ripening to purple with white spots.

Distribution
Maianthemum comaltepecense is known only from one population in Oaxaca, Mexico.

Habitat and ecology
Found growing in moist, shaded oak forests at 2900 m. Mosses, lichens and ferns abundant.

Similar species
The complex raceme of Maianthemum comaltepecense, with 2 flowers at some nodes, is similar to that of Maianthemum canadense and Maianthemum dilatatum, however the leaves are quite different and the distributions are well separated. Maianthemum scilloideum is similar and also found in Mexico, but plants are more robust, generally have 8 to 12 leaves per stem and the fruits are usually spherical and red at maturity.

References

Bibliography

comaltepecense
Flora of Oaxaca
Plants described in 1996